The name Alcon (Ancient Greek: Ἄλκων) or Alco can refer to a number of people from classical myth:
 Alcon, a Laconian prince as the son of King Hippocoon, usurper of Tyndareus. He was one of the hunters of the Calydonian Boar. Alcon was killed, together with his father and brothers, by Heracles, and had a heroon at Sparta.
 Alcon, a son of Erechtheus, king of Athens, and father of Phalerus the Argonaut. Gaius Valerius Flaccus represents him as such a skillful archer that once, when a serpent had entwined his son, he shot the serpent without hurting his child. Virgil mentions an Alcon, whom Servius calls a Cretan, and of whom he relates almost the same story as that which Valerius Flaccus ascribes to Alcon, the son of Erechtheus.
Alcon, son of Abas, king of the Abantes in Euboea and thus, brother to Arethousa and Dias. He may also be a brother to Canethus and Chalcodon, father of Elephenor.
Alcon, a son of Ares, and another one of the hunters of the Calydonian Boar, according to Hyginus.
 Another, otherwise unknown personage, of the same name occurs in Cicero.

Notes

References 

 Apollodorus, The Library with an English Translation by Sir James George Frazer, F.B.A., F.R.S. in 2 Volumes, Cambridge, MA, Harvard University Press; London, William Heinemann Ltd. 1921. ISBN 0-674-99135-4. Online version at the Perseus Digital Library. Greek text available from the same website.
Apollonius Rhodius, Argonautica translated by Robert Cooper Seaton (1853-1915), R. C. Loeb Classical Library Volume 001. London, William Heinemann Ltd, 1912. Online version at the Topos Text Project.
 Apollonius Rhodius, Argonautica. George W. Mooney. London. Longmans, Green. 1912. Greek text available at the Perseus Digital Library.
 Gaius Julius Hyginus, Fabulae from The Myths of Hyginus translated and edited by Mary Grant. University of Kansas Publications in Humanistic Studies. Online version at the Topos Text Project.
 Gaius Valerius Flaccus, Argonautica translated by Mozley, J H. Loeb Classical Library Volume 286. Cambridge, MA, Harvard University Press; London, William Heinemann Ltd. 1928. Online version at theio.com.
 Gaius Valerius Flaccus, Argonauticon. Otto Kramer. Leipzig. Teubner. 1913. Latin text available at the Perseus Digital Library.
 Marcus Tullius Cicero, Nature of the Gods from the Treatises of M.T. Cicero translated by Charles Duke Yonge (1812-1891), Bohn edition of 1878. Online version at the Topos Text Project.
 Marcus Tullius Cicero, De Natura Deorum. O. Plasberg. Leipzig. Teubner. 1917.  Latin text available at the Perseus Digital Library.
 Parada, Carlos, Genealogical Guide to Greek Mythology, Jonsered, Paul Åströms Förlag, 1993. .
 Pausanias, Description of Greece with an English Translation by W.H.S. Jones, Litt.D., and H.A. Ormerod, M.A., in 4 Volumes. Cambridge, MA, Harvard University Press; London, William Heinemann Ltd. 1918. . Online version at the Perseus Digital Library
Pausanias, Graeciae Descriptio. 3 vols. Leipzig, Teubner. 1903.  Greek text available at the Perseus Digital Library.
 Publius Vergilius Maro, Eclogues. J. B. Greenough. Boston. Ginn & Co. 1895. Online version at the Perseus Digital Library.
 Publius Vergilius Maro, Bucolics, Aeneid, and Georgics of Vergil. J. B. Greenough. Boston. Ginn & Co. 1900. Latin text available at the Perseus Digital Library.

Princes in Greek mythology
Greek mythological heroes
Attican characters in Greek mythology
Laconian mythology